The 1896 United States presidential election in Illinois took place on November 3, 1896. All contemporary 45 states were part of the 1896 United States presidential election. State voters chose 24 electors to the Electoral College, which selected the president and vice president.

Illinois was won by the Republican nominees, former Ohio Governor William McKinley and his running mate Garret Hobart of New Jersey.

Results

See also
 United States presidential elections in Illinois

Notes

References

Illinois
1896
1896 Illinois elections